Zak Storm (also known as Zak Storm: Super Pirate) is a computer animated television series produced by Zagtoon, Method Animation, De Agostini Editore, SAMG Animation, MNC Animation, and Man of Action. It debuted on Canal J in France on 2 December 2016. It debuted in the United States on KidsClick from 30 September 2017 to 7 January 2018, followed by Discovery Family on 14 October 2017. A second season is currently in the works.

Premise
When teenager Zak Storm takes his father's necklace and goes surfing, he is suddenly sucked by a giant wave and ends up in the Bermuda Triangle where he is picked up by a sentient pirate ship called the Chaos with a talking sword named Calabrass. He discovers that the necklace contains a gem called the Eye of Beru, which gives him special powers, and that in order to return home, he needs to become the captain of the Chaos and unite the Seven Seas. He assembles a band of misfits: a ghost boy, an Atlantean princess, a Viking, and a space alien.

Characters

Main
 Zak Storm (full name "Conrad Zacharie Storm") is a 13-year-old boy who ends up getting sucked into the Seven Seas of the Bermuda Triangle whilst out surfing. Zak is voiced by Michael Johnston in the English dub, and by Hervé Grull in the French dub.
 Cece Lejune (full name "Chrysta Coraline Lejune") Atlantean princess and Zak Storm's first mate, helping him stay grounded and keeping his brash side in check. Cece is voiced by Christine Marie Cabanos in English, and by Marie Nonnenmacher in French.
 Crogar, a 15-year-old Viking pirate and the muscle of the Seven Cs, often shouting "Ragnarok!" as a battle-cry. Crogar is voiced by Chris Smith in English, and by Marc Duquenoy in French.
 Caramba, a small green alien in a yellow exo-skeleton who serves as the Seven Cs' engineer. He is voiced by Max Mittelman in English, and by Olivier Podesta in French.
 Clovis, a 7-year-old Ectoplasmic-spectre-of-awesome (as he calls himself), not a ghost. Clovis is bound to the ship Chaos and supposedly lost his body, leaving him in his ethereal state. Clovis is voiced by Reba Buhr in English, and by Elodie Menant in French.
 Calabrass is Zak's magical talking sword that grants Zak his powers, and also serves as his mentor. Calabrass holds the Seven Eyes of the Seven Seas of the Bermuda Triangle, and these Eyes each grant his wielder, Zak, a different elemental power and turn Calabrass into a new weapon. However, for each transformation, he expends energy and needs time to recover. Calabrass is voiced by Kyle Hebert in English, and by Jérôme Wiggins in French.
 The Chaos, a living and surprisingly high-tech pirate ship, doesn't speak but counts as a member of the crew and is surprisingly full of personality. Very loyal to his crew, but can be moody at times. Saves Zak from nearly being eaten by the kraken, when he first comes into the triangle, and never lets his Captain down, even when Zak pushes him too far.

Recurring
 Skullivar, the undead, dark ruler of his own skeleton army, who wants to take over the triangle, is Zak's archenemy  and tries to steal the Seven Eyes of the Seven Seas for himself and capture Zak. Skullivar is voiced by David Roach in English.
 Golden Bones is Skullivar's undead, skeleton lieutenant. He is the captain of a ship called Demoniac and has a literal skeleton crew. He loathes Zak because he's "just a kid" who always beats him in battle. He would give anything to see Zak gone for good. Golden Bones is voiced by Matthew Mercer.
 Zephyra, daughter of Sassafras . She is half human and half Zitean. She has a moon-shaped magical necklace . She was only appears in the Episode "Between Stars". She also helped 7Cs. While Caramba and Crogar have crush on her
 Sassafras, a witch that helps out Zak and the 7Cs. She is voiced by Jessica Gee-George in English.
 Alan Gamble, A pirate who is considered a "hero",but he doesn't always act like it.
Anubis based on the Egyptian God Of Death, Anubis is the guardian of Dezer's Waypoint. He takes his role serious as a guardian because to him, trapped in the Triangle is like death; once you crossed over, you can never go back. He can control sand, giant scorpions and mummy minions. He has golden mechanics on his back that resembles a scorpion's tail and pincers. Voiced by David Roach.
 Lemurians are underwater dwellers who wage wars on the Atlanteans. They wear living obsidian armor.
Admiral T'Halis, a Lemurian general and a powerful warrior among the Lemurian Guards. He's a sadistic warmonger who has great hatred to all Atlanteans, even in the Triangle, and seeks to conquer Atlantis and all the seas on Earth. He has a hatred for humans, or Terrans, as well. Voiced by Richard Epcar
Lemurian Commander, his appearance is similar to the guards but his armor is colored red.
Lemurian Guard Their armor resembles allot like Spartan armor.

Broadcast
Zak Storm was originally meant to air on Gulli in France. The series is also planned to air on RCTI in Indonesia, on Super RTL in Germany, DeA Kids and Super! in Italy, Clan and Canal Panda in Spain, OUFtivi in Wallonia, Kadet in Flanders, Radio Télévision Suisse in French Switzerland, Telekids in the Netherlands, SIC in Portugal, Pop and Pop Max in the United Kingdom, Discovery Family, KidsClick and Netflix in the United States, Discovery Kids in Latin America, WNYO and Family Channel/CHRGD in Canada, Yoopa in French Canada, PLUSPLUS in Ukraine, TVNZ Kidzone in New Zealand, Okto in Singapore, Spacetoon in Middle East and in South Africa on eToonz.

Episode list
The 39 episodes are organized by the French production numbering as posted by Télé Star. Airdates in the United States are for Discovery Family (DFC) and release dates from Netflix. As the show was syndicated for broadcast in multiple countries, others may air prior to these dates.

Home media
In 2018, Shout! Factory Kids signed a deal with ZAG Heroez to secure the North American DVD rights to Zak Storm. Other media companies that will produce home media include Koch Media in Italy, Eden Germany GmbH in Germany, and Dazzler Media in the United Kingdom.

Region 1

In the United States and Canada, there are 4 DVD episodes from season one, with both English and French audio tracks, was released.

A first DVD, subtitled Volume 1 which was released on 13 March 2018.

A second DVD, subtitled Volume 2, which was released on 6 June 2018.

In between Volume 2 DVD and Volume 3 DVD of Zak Storm Super Pirate for 11 Months, Zagtoon concentrated for carrying on making more episodes for Miraculous Ladybug and starting episodes of a Reboot TV Series called Denver & Cliff in 2018. Then 11 months later the third DVD of Zak Storm came out in the month of May 2019.

A third DVD, subtitled Volume 3, which was released on 17 May 2019.

Then again In Between Volume 3 DVD and Volume 4 DVD of Zak Storm Super Pirate for 8 Months, Zagtoon concentrated back to carrying on making more episodes for Miraculous Ladybug and carrying on episodes of the Reboot TV Series Denver & Cliff in 2018. Then 8 months later the fourth DVD of Zak Storm came out in the month of January 2020.

A fourth DVD, subtitled Volume 4, was released on 30 January 2020.

After the fourth Instalment of Volume 4 DVD from Zak Storm Super Pirate, Zagtoon and stopped making more Region 1 DVDS from now on of Zak Storm Super Pirate, But Zagtoon are more releasing Region 2 DVD's of Zak Storm Super Pirate instead.

Region 1 DVDs

Main Series

Region 2 

In the UK, the first DVD, from season One called Zak Storm Volume 1: Origins & Other Stores was released on 1 July 2019.

A second DVD, Zak Storm Volume 2: A Jellyfish of Legend and other Stories, which was released on 7 October 2019.

A third DVD, Zak Storm Volume 3: The Labyrinth of the Minotaur and Other Stories, which was released on 2 March 2020.

The 1st 3 DVDS of Zak Storm was released by Spirit Entertainment, But after Volume 3 Came out on 2 Marsh 2020, Spirit Entertainment Studio Company Left the Project of carrying on releasing Zak Storm DVDS.

So therefore, a Different Studio Company called Dazzler Media took over Spirit Entertainment and carried on releasing Zak Storm DVDS, Starting with Zak Storm Volume 4: Island of the Lost Storm & Other Stories, which was released on 3 August 2020.

A fifth DVD, ''Zak Storm Volume 5: Viking Connexion & Other Stories", which was released on 5 October 2020.

Region 2 DVDs

Main Series

References

External links

 
 
  on Canal J

2016 American television series debuts
2016 French television series debuts
2016 Indonesian television series debuts
2010s American animated television series
2010s French animated television series
American children's animated action television series
American children's animated adventure television series
American children's animated science fantasy television series
French children's animated action television series
French children's animated adventure television series
French children's animated science fantasy television series
Indonesian children's animated action television series
Indonesian children's animated adventure television series
Indonesian children's animated science fantasy television series
Italian children's animated action television series
Italian children's animated adventure television series
Italian children's animated science fantasy television series
South Korean children's animated action television series
South Korean children's animated adventure television series
South Korean children's animated science fantasy television series
Anime-influenced Western animated television series
French-language television shows
English-language television shows
Kraken in popular culture
Man of Action Studios
American computer-animated television series
French computer-animated television series
Sentient objects in fiction
Animated television series about robots
Television series by Method Animation
Television series about pirates
Teen animated television series